Challapalli (officially known as Challapalle) is a village in the Krishna district of the Indian state of Andhra Pradesh. It is located in the Challapalli mandal, Machilipatnam revenue division.

Geography

Demographics

According to the 2011 Census of India, Challapalli had a population of 17,069 inhabitants: 8,183 males and 8,884 females. It has an average gender ratio of 1,086 females per 1,000 males, which is higher than the national average of 940 per 1,000. The average literacy rate stands at 83.28%, significantly higher than the national average of 73.00%.

History 

In the early 18th century, the Raja of Challapalli, Yaralagadda Ankineedu Prasad built Challapalli. The village of Challapalli developed around the palace and became the capital for the Devarkota Estate. The last crowned monarch of Challapalli was Yarlagadda Sivaram Prasad (1906–1976). As of 2012, the royal family members no longer reside in the fort. 

Yarlagadda Rajas of the Challapalli fort and Zamindari were the rulers in this area from the 15th century until recently when the Kingdom was disbanded due to the land Cease Act of the Indian Government.

See also 
Villages in Challapalli mandal

References 

Villages in Krishna district
Mandal headquarters in Krishna district